Slobozia Mare is a village in Cahul District, Moldova.

Notable people
 Gheorghe Mare 
 Eugeniu Grebenicov

Bibliography 
 Vasile Plăcintă, Slobozia Mare, prin fereastra istoriei, Galați : Geneze, [1996]

References

Villages of Cahul District
Populated places on the Prut